Gene Freeman, known professionally as Machine, is an American music producer and engineer who has worked with many bands, including Lamb of God, Clutch, As It Is, Crobot and others.

Discography 
Machine has worked with a number of artists on their albums:

References

American record producers
Living people
Year of birth missing (living people)